Aikaterini Klepkou (born 22 May 1972) is a Greek swimmer. She competed in three events at the 1996 Summer Olympics.

References

External links
 

1972 births
Living people
Greek female swimmers
Olympic swimmers of Greece
Swimmers at the 1996 Summer Olympics
Place of birth missing (living people)